Ibrahim "Abe" Moussa Baggili is a cybersecurity and digital forensics scientist at Louisiana State University with a joint appointment between the college of engineering and the Center for Computation and Technology.  Before that, he was the founder and director of the Connecticut Institute of Technology (CIT) at the University of New Haven. Baggili was also a full professor and Elder Family Endowed Chair at UNewHaven. He has a B.S., M.S., and Ph.D. in Computer and Information Technology from Purdue University's Purdue Polytechnic Institute. Baggili is a Jordanian/Arab American first generation college graduate and a well-known scientist in the domain of Cyber Forensics and Cybersecurity with seminal peer-reviewed work in the areas of Virtual Reality Forensics (VR) and security, mobile device forensics and security, application forensics, drone forensics and memory forensics.

Awards & Notable Grants 
Baggili has won several awards.

Notable Awards 

 2022: Baggili was inducted into the Connecticut Academy of Science and  Engineering (CASE) 
 2021: Baggili received the Connecticut Civilian Medal of Merit for training the Connecticut National Guard in Cybersecurity was only awarded to five people at the time. 
 2021: Best Paper Award, ARES, WSDF.
 2020: Baggili has also been named a European Alliance for Innovation Fellow comprising 0.1% of the members. 
 2019: Baggili was named the last lecturer at the University of New Haven by University President Steven Kaplan - a video of the lecture is available on Youtube.
 2018: Best Paper Award, ICDF2C.
 2015: Baggili was named the Elder Family Chair of Computer Science and Cybersecurity at the University of New Haven. 
 2014: Best Paper Award, ICDF2C.
 2008: Baggili  was awarded the prestigious Bilsland Dissertation Fellowship at Purdue University in 2008.
 2005: Nominated for 'The Chancellor's List' 'The highest academic honor to which students can aspire.
 2002: Bachelor of Science with distinction, Purdue University, Dec 14, 2002.
 2002: Recognized by the National Society of Collegiate Scholars.
 2002: United States Achievement Academy, Computer Science Awards Winner, Spring 2002.
 2001: Associate of Science with distinction, Purdue University, Dec 15 2001.

Notable Grants 
National Science Foundation Award # 1921813 - University of New Haven CyberCorps Scholarship for Service (SFS): Super Cyber Operatives (SCOs).
 National Science Foundation Award # 1900210 - SaTC: EDU: Expanding Digital Forensics Education with Artifact Curation and Scalable, Accessible Artifact Exercises.
 National Science Foundation Award # 1649101- National Workshop on Redefining Cyber Forensics.
 National Science Foundation Award # 1748950 - Exploring cybersecurity and forensics of Virtual Reality systems and their impact on cybersecurity education.

Known For 
Baggili, along with his students, are known for their contributions to the digital forensics and cybersecurity.

 His research with his students have uncovered vulnerabilities that affect over 1.5 billion people worldwide.
 His team was the first to explore memory forensics, and disk and network forensics of consumer Virtual Reality (VR) systems. 
 His team was the first to show proof of concept attacks in consumer Virtual Reality (VR) systems, which inspired the creation of X-Reality Safety Initiative (XRSI).
 The freely available NSF funded Artifact Genome Project which curates digital forensic artifacts and digital forensic academic exercises.
 First Jordanian and Arab to pursue a PhD focus in Cyber Forensics.

Career 
Baggili served as editor-in-chief for the Journal of Digital Forensics, Security, and Law. He has worked as a Digital Forensics Consultant for Cryptic Software Ltd. in the UK and as a Security Policies, Procedures and Standards Consultant for BISYS Education Services. In 2005, he founded Security Triangle in Amman Governorate, Jordan, and in 2010, he co-founded Viral Labs/Technologies, a start-up in the United Arab Emirates.

From 2009 to 2013 Baggili was an assistant professor at Zayed University, working on digital forensic research projects, where he chaired the second annual ICDF2C Conference. He also founded and directed the Advanced Cyber Forensics Research Laboratory, which helped train individuals in the public and private sector in several areas of cyber forensics, including network and small-scale device forensics.

In 2013, Baggili joined the University of New Haven as an associate professor and assistant dean. In 2021, he was made full professor elect. At the university, he has founded the Cyber Forensics Research and Education Group (UNHcFREG)  and created the Artifact Genome Project (AGP). With mostly student researchers, the group has published dozens of papers on various cyber security and forensics topics, many of which have been presented at conferences such as the Digital Forensics Research Workshop  and ICDF2C, and published in journals such as Digital Investigation. AGP was created with the help of Purdue University's VACCINE  to address the need for a centralized location to share digital forensic artifacts. Since its inception, participants, ranging from federal agencies to universities to private companies, have uploaded over 1,200 artifacts. As a database, AGP has been utilized by investigators, and forteaching digital forensics.

At UNewHaven, Baggili   also hosted GenCyber, a National Science Foundation and National Security Agency funded program, for several summers. The program aims to introduce a diverse student population to cybersecurity concepts by engaging them in hands-on activities and experiences.

In August, 2022, Baggili joined Louisiana State University as a full professor with a joint appointment between the college of engineering and the Center for Computation and Technology.

Most-cited peer reviewed publications 
 Al Mutawa N, Baggili I, Marrington A. Forensic analysis of social networking applications on mobile devices. Digital investigation. 2012 Aug 1;9:S24-33. (Cited 223 times, according to Google Scholar  )
 Ruan K, Carthy J, Kechadi T, Baggili I. Cloud forensics definitions and critical criteria for cloud forensic capability: An overview of survey results. Digital Investigation. 2013 Jun 1;10(1):34-43.
 Walnycky D, Baggili I, Marrington A, Moore J, Breitinger F. Network and device forensic analysis of android social-messaging applications. Digital Investigation. 2015 Aug 1;14:S77-84. (Cited 191 times, according to Google Scholar.) 
 Karpisek F, Baggili I, Breitinger F. WhatsApp network forensics: Decrypting and understanding the WhatsApp call signaling messages. Digital Investigation. 2015 Dec 1;15:110-8. (Cited 93 times, according to Google Scholar.) 
 Al Mutawa N, Al Awadhi I, Baggili I, Marrington A. Forensic artifacts of Facebook's instant messaging service. In2011 International Conference for Internet Technology and Secured Transactions 2011 Dec 11 (pp. 771–776). IEEE. (Cited 65 times, according to Google Scholar.)

References

External links 
 UNH Faculty Profile
 

Living people
Computer security specialists
University of New Haven faculty
Purdue University alumni
Academic staff of Zayed University
Jordanian scientists
Jordanian emigrants to the United States
1981 births